The AvidxChange Music Factory is an entertainment complex located in downtown Charlotte, North Carolina. It consists of two concert venues and a number of restaurants and bars on the former site of a mill in the northern end of the downtown area.

History
The complex first opened in 2006 as the NC Music Factory. Developer ARK Group wanted to build a Charlotte version of New York City's SoHo, and intended it as the first stage of an entertainment, office and residential district.

In 2016, payment software firm AvidxChange took over the naming rights for the complex. On March 1, 2016; it officially changed its name to the AvidxChange Music Factory. Terms for the naming rights were not disclosed.

Venues
The centerpieces of the complex are the Charlotte Metro Credit Union Amphitheatre and The Fillmore Charlotte, two entertainment venues managed by Live Nation.

Charlotte Metro Credit Union Amphitheatre
The Charlotte Metro Credit Union Amphitheatre seats 5,000 people, including 2,000 reserved seats and a festival lawn that can accommodate up to 3,000 people. It opened in June 2009. When it opened, it took most of the major acts that had previously played at the Palladium at Carowinds.

Originally known as simply the "Uptown Amphitheatre," it has also been known as the Road Runner Mobile Amphitheatre.

The Fillmore Charlotte
The Fillmore Charlotte opened in June 2009, shortly after the amphitheatre opened next door.

References

External links
 
 Official Music Factory Website
 The Fillmore Charlotte

Buildings and structures in Charlotte, North Carolina
Culture of Charlotte, North Carolina
Amphitheaters in North Carolina
Amphitheaters in the United States
Music venues in North Carolina
Tourist attractions in Charlotte, North Carolina